The Tucson Open was a golf tournament in Arizona on the PGA Tour from 1945 to 2006, played annually in the winter in Tucson. It was last held at the Omni Tucson National Golf Resort in late February, with a $3 million purse and a $540,000 winner's share.

History
Since the event's inception in 1945, it had been played at a series of courses in Tucson. The first eighteen editions were at El Rio Golf & Country Club, which was purchased by the city in 1968 and is now El Rio Golf Course. In 1963, the event moved to Forty Niner Country Club in 1963 for two years, then began its lengthy relationship with its last location, known at the time as Tucson National Golf Club, which hosted through 1978. It moved to Randolph Park Golf Course in 1979, returned to Tucson National in 1980, then back to Randolph Park for the next six.

From 1984 to 1986, the Tucson Open was contested at match play and was held concurrently with a Senior PGA Tour match play event, the Seiko-Tucson Senior Match Play Championship The 1986 event was played using a Medal match play format.

In 1987 and 1988 the event was played at the TPC at Starr Pass but was not held in 1989. When the event resumed in 1990, it was played at two courses each year from that year's event until 1996. One used every year was the TPC at Starr Pass (renamed Starr Pass Golf Club before the 1993 event). The TPC at Starr Pass shared time with Randolph Park in 1990; from 1991–96 the Tucson National GC was the other course used.

In 1997, the event changed to the more traditional format of 72 holes played at only one course, and has been played since that year at the renamed Omni Tucson National Golf Resort & Spa. 

In later years, it was an alternate event, opposite the WGC Match Play championship, then held at La Costa in Carlsbad, California. Because the top 64 ranked players in the world are invited to the WGC event, it weakened the field considerably for Tucson. The match play tournament moved to Tucson in 2007 as a "merging" of sorts between the two tournaments, and stayed through 2014.

On the PGA Tour Champions, the Tucson Conquistadores Classic made its debut in 2015, and is held at the Omni Tucson National Resort in mid-March.

Tournament highlights
1945: Ray Mangrum shoots a final round 64 to win the inaugural version of the tournament.
1947: Jimmy Demaret becomes the first Tucson champion to successfully defend a title. A final round 65 allows him to finish three shots ahead of Ben Hogan.
1949: Lloyd Mangrum shoots a tournament record 263. He wins by five shots over Al Smith.
1955: Tommy Bolt eagles the 72nd hole to successfully defend his Tucson Open title.
1959: Gene Littler wins for the second consecutive week on the PGA Tour. He finishes one shot ahead of Joe Campbell and Art Wall Jr. 
1961: Controversial pro golfer Dave Hill wins for the first time on the PGA Tour. He defeats Tommy Bolt and Bud Sullivan on the third hole of a sudden death playoff.
1962: Phil Rodgers holes a wedge shot from 65-feet for eagle on the 72nd hole to edge Bud Sullivan by one shot. 
1965: Only after deciding to play the tournament five minutes before its deadline for entries, New Zealand born Bob Charles makes Tucson his second ever win in the United States. He beats Al Geiberger by four shots.
1968: George Knudson wins for the second consecutive week on the PGA Tour. He finishes one shot ahead of Frank Beard and Frank Boynton.
1970: Lee Trevino successfully defends his Tucson Open title. He birdies the first hole of a sudden death playoff to defeat Bob Murphy.
1974: Johnny Miller becomes the first ever golfer in PGA Tour history to win three consecutive tournaments to start the season. He shoots a first round 62 on his way to a three shot triumph over Ben Crenshaw.
1975: Tom Weiskopf misses the 36 hole cut with scores of 70 and 78. Afterwards tournament director Biff Baker made a telephone complaint to PGA Tour Commissioner Deane Beman accusing Weiskopf of backhanding putts and not playing in a professional manner. Weiskopf denied the allegations by saying "All they have to do is ask my playing partners."
1976: Johnny Miller wins at Tucson for the third consecutive year. He finishes three shots ahead of Howard Twitty.
1977: Bruce Lietzke earns the first of his thirteen career PGA Tour wins by defeating Gene Littler on the fourth hole of a sudden death playoff.
1980: Poor weather causes the tournament to finish on a Tuesday. Jim Colbert is the winner by four shots over Dan Halldorson.
1981: Johnny Miller wins Tucson for the fourth time. He shoots a final round 65 to finish two shots ahead of Lon Hinkle.
1984: For the first of three consecutive years, Tucson is conducted as a match play event. Tom Watson wins by defeating defending champion Gil Morgan in the finals by the score of 2 and 1.
1986: Defending champion Jim Thorpe wins the last match play edition of Tucson. He defeats Scott Simpson 67 to 71 in the finals.
1990: Robert Gamez wins on the PGA Tour in his first ever event. He finishes four shots ahead of Mark Calcavecchia and Jay Haas. During the tournament's second round, 1988 Tucson champion David Frost, becomes the first PGA Tour player in 33 years to shoot a 60.
1991: Twenty-year-old amateur Phil Mickelson birdies the 72nd hole to win by one shot over Bob Tway and Tom Purtzer. Purtzer made double bogey on the tournament's final hole. Hal Sutton hits a six-iron for his second shot on the 9th hole directly at the green. The ball slammed into the cup without touching the green and embedded itself in the lip of the hole. Since part of the ball remained above the level of the hole, it was ruled that Sutton had not holed out. He had to replace the ball and putt it in for a birdie. 
1992: Future two-time U.S. Open champion Lee Janzen collects his first ever PGA Tour title. He edges Bill Britton by one shot.
1995: Phil Mickelson wins his second Tucson title by one shot over  Jim Gallagher Jr. and Scott Simpson after Gallagher three putts the 72nd hole.
1997: Jeff Sluman earns his first PGA Tour title since the 1988 PGA Championship. He wins by one shot over Steve Jones.
2000: After playing in 292 PGA Tour events, Jim Carter finally reaches the winner's circle. He finishes two shots ahead of Jean van de Velde, Chris DiMarco, and Tom Scherrer. 
2001: Like Robert Gamez did at the 1990 Tucson, Garrett Willis wins on the PGA Tour in his first ever event. He wins by one shot over Kevin Sutherland.
2005: Future U.S. Open winner Geoff Ogilvy notches his first ever PGA Tour win. He defeats Mark Calcavecchia and Kevin Na in a sudden death playoff.

Winners

Multiple winners
Nine men won this tournament more than once.
4 wins
Johnny Miller: 1974, 1975, 1976, 1981
3 wins
Phil Mickelson: 1991(a), 1995, 1996
2 wins
Jim Thorpe: 1985, 1986
Bruce Lietzke: 1977, 1979
Lee Trevino: 1969, 1970
Don January: 1960, 1963
Tommy Bolt: 1953, 1955
Lloyd Mangrum: 1949, 1951
Jimmy Demaret, 1946, 1947

References

Former PGA Tour events
Golf in Arizona
Sports in Tucson, Arizona
Events in Tucson, Arizona
Recurring sporting events established in 1945
Recurring sporting events disestablished in 2006
1945 establishments in Arizona
2006 disestablishments in Arizona